Alfred "Alfie" Miller (born  in Whitley Bay, England) is a former British professional ice hockey player who played for the Whitley Braves and Warriors between 1976 and 1992. He also played in four World Championships for the Great Britain national ice hockey team between 1976 and 1981. He was inducted to the British Ice Hockey Hall of Fame in 1989.

References
British Ice Hockey Hall of Fame entry

1954 births
Living people
People from Whitley Bay
Sportspeople from Tyne and Wear
English ice hockey forwards
British Ice Hockey Hall of Fame inductees